Rooiberg is a town in Waterberg District Municipality in the Limpopo province of South Africa.

Town, archaeological site and tin-mining area, 50 km west-north-west of Warmbad, at the conjunction of the Springbok Flats with the Waterberg Plateau. The name is Afrikaans for ‘red mountain’.

References

Populated places in the Thabazimbi Local Municipality
Mining communities in South Africa